Trigonocephalus halys is a taxonomic synonym that may refer to:

 Gloydius halys, a.k.a. the Siberian pit viper, a venomous pitviper species found in Russia and China
 Gloydius intermedius, a.k.a. the Central Asian pitviper, a venomous pitviper species found in northern Asia